Alamode may refer to
 Alamode, A 17th century silk material, used in England and France
 Alamode, Missouri
 Alamode Island
 à la mode
 À la mode (EP)